The 2010 Angola Basketball Super Cup (17th edition) was contested by Primeiro de Agosto, as the 2009 league champion and Petro Atlético, the 2009 cup runner-up. Primeiro de Agosto was the winner, making it is's 9th title.

The 2010 Women's Super Cup (15th edition) was contested by Primeiro de Agosto, as the 2009 women's league champion and Interclube, the 2009 cup runner-up. Interclube was the winner, making it is's 3rd title.

2010 Men's Super Cup

2010 Women's Super Cup

See also
 2009 Angola Basketball Cup
 2009 BAI Basket
 2010 Victorino Cunha Cup

References

Angola Basketball Super Cup seasons
Super Cup